Insaf Yahyaoui (born January 3, 1981) is a Tunisian judoka.

She finished in joint fifth place in the heavyweight (+78 kg) division at the 2004 Summer Olympics, having lost the bronze medal match to Tea Donguzashvili of Russia.

External links
Insaf Yahyaoui at Sports Reference

1981 births
Living people
Tunisian female judoka
Judoka at the 2004 Summer Olympics
Olympic judoka of Tunisia
Mediterranean Games bronze medalists for Tunisia
Mediterranean Games medalists in judo
Competitors at the 2005 Mediterranean Games
21st-century Tunisian women
20th-century Tunisian women
African Games medalists in judo
Competitors at the 2003 All-Africa Games
African Games silver medalists for Tunisia
African Games bronze medalists for Tunisia